This is a list of Catholic churches in greater Leicester, in Leicestershire, England, which corresponds to the area of the Deanery of Leicester in terms of Catholic governance. The Deanery of Leicester falls under the Roman Catholic Diocese of Nottingham and covers the city of Leicester and its surroundings, including several communities within and without the city limits: Braunstone, New Parks, Aylestone, Eyres Monsell, Wigston, Netherhall, Rushey Mead, Beaumont Leys, Knighton, Oadby, Birstall, Rothley, Market Harborough, Husbands Bosworth, Earl Shilton, Hinckley, Market Bosworth, Lutterworth, and Narborough.

A deanery is a geographical group of parishes under the oversight of an appointed dean, which as of 2020 is the Rev. Mgr. John Hadley.

Churches

The Roman Catholic church assisted in the creation of a Polish Catholic church located on Wakerley Road in Leicester. Its parish was established in 1948 and celebrated its 70th anniversary in 2018. It was created to serve members of the Polish Armed Forces and their families in nearby military camps, and began with Dominican support by meeting within the Roman Catholic Holy Cross Priory. In the 1960s, with more than 4,000 parishioners, an effort to raise funds and secure a separate facility was undertaken, resulting in the parish assuming use of a former Methodist church on Melbourne Road.

Former churches

The chapel of Rothley Temple, built c.1240, associated with the Knights Templar and the Knights Hospitaller, survives as part of the Rothley Court Hotel in the village of Rothley.

Ruins of the Abbey of Saint Mary de Pratis, more commonly known as Leicester Abbey, survive, and are Grade I listed.  The abbey was an Augustinian religious house, founded in the 12th century by Robert de Beaumont, 2nd Earl of Leicester, and grew to become the wealthiest religious establishment within Leicestershire. Looted and destroyed in 1645 during the English Civil War.

There was a church named St. Michael's, of one of Leicester's oldest parishes, which was demolished by about 1450.  "Very little is known" about the church. It was perhaps located near what is now Vine Street and Elbow Lane.  This was in the northeast part of the medieval walled town, an area which is believed to have largely depopulated after devastation in the siege of 1173.

See also
List of Roman Catholic churches in the United Kingdom
 Anglican churches in Leicester
 Roman Catholic Diocese of Nottingham

References

External links
Return of Catholicism to Leicester 1746–1946, by A. Kimberlin, 1946
Where Leicester has Worshipped
University of Leicester Archaeology and Ancient History Interactive Geo map of sites

Lists of churches in England
Roman Catholic churches in Leicestershire
churches catholic
Roman Catholic churches in England